Parti écologiste “Les Verts” v European Parliament (1986) Case 294/83 is an EU law case, concerning the constitutional framework, and party political funding, in the European Union. The case is significant for being the first to suggest that the European Union is based on the "rule of law", and has been described as "legendary".

Facts
The Green Party challenged political party funding from the Parliament. They claimed the system was unfair in distribution against newer parties. They sought a declaration that the European Community was not entitled to give funding for political parties.

Judgment
The Court of Justice held the matter of party political funding should be regarded as one which is entirely for the member states to decide under the Treaty on the Functioning of the European Union article 7(2) of the Act of 20 September 1976 Concerning the Election of the Representatives of the Assembly Direct Universal Suffrage.

With the ruling, was declared unlawful the system by which the European political parties were financed with economic resources directly from the budgets of the individual parliamentary groups, which were funded through resources from the general budget of the European Communities. This system gave undue advantages to political entities belonging to an elective institution: for the Court, public resources should be allocated without distinction between parties present in Parliament and those willing to enter it for the first time.

See also

European Union law

Notes

References
Joliet and Keeling, ‘The Reimbursement of Election Expenses: A Forgotten Dispute’ (1994) 19 ELR 243

Court of Justice of the European Union case law